Emoseh Khamofu (born 1 January 1997) known professionally as Bloody Civilian is a Nigerian singer, songwriter and a record producer signed to Def Jam Recordings. She is most noted for her single "How To Kill A Man" and "Wake Up" featuring Rema, which was soundtracked in the American 2022 superhero film Black Panther. Bloody is profiled by The Guardian as among the most radical of emerging mavericks in Nigerian music scene and by NME as an essential emerging artist for 2023.

Early life 
Originally from Taraba State, Emoseh grew up in the Northern part of Nigeria, in between Kaduna, Jos and Abuja which said inspired her art. She was raised in a conservative environment and was not allowed to move around by her parents. As a teen, Emoseh was known in her school as a kid who could sing and play the guitar because she often involved in school talent shows where she performed original music and people learnt her lyrics. She would go on and started making beats and giving it to rappers at school, gradually Emoseh started working on her own musically and perfecting her production skills in the procedure. Growing up, everyone around Emoseh thought music was a hobby to her including herself, except his dad who wanted her to study music in school. At aged 8, She started writing songs which she often gave to her parents. Emoseh's dad who she said is part of her early music foundations, used to be a musical tourist in a band back in the days. Her name "Bloody Civilian", was inspired by her growing up in the northern of Nigeria where there is an abundance of military violences.

Career 
Emoseh started as a record producer before embarking fully as a recording artist. Her debut single "How To Kill A Man" was released in 2022, with the video released the same year which was written, shot, produced and directed by her. The same year, "Wake Up" written and produced by her which featured Nigerian star Rema, an official soundtrack for the Marvel Blockbuster, Black Panther: Wakanda Forever was released.

References

External links 
 Bloody Civilian at AllMusic

Living people
1997 births
Nigerian singer-songwriters
Nigerian record producers
21st-century Nigerian musicians
Year of birth uncertain